Jonathan Moxey (born January 14, 1995) is a professional gridiron football cornerback for the Calgary Stampeders of the Canadian Football League (CFL). He played college football at Boise State, and was signed by the Tampa Bay Buccaneers as an undrafted free agent in 2017. He has also been a member of the Arizona Cardinals.

Professional career

Tampa Bay Buccaneers
Moxey signed with the Tampa Bay Buccaneers as an undrafted free agent on May 1, 2017. He was waived on September 2, 2017 and was signed to the Buccaneers' practice squad the next day. He was released on September 19, 2017.

Arizona Cardinals
On December 27, 2017, Moxey was signed to the Arizona Cardinals' practice squad. He signed a reserve/future contract with the Cardinals on January 2, 2018. On September 1, 2018, Moxey was waived by the Cardinals. He was re-signed to their practice squad on December 18, 2018. He signed a reserve/future contract with the Cardinals on December 31, 2018. He was waived on May 10, 2019.

Calgary Stampeders
Moxey signed with the Calgary Stampeders on June 24, 2019. He played in his first game on July 25, 2019 against the Ottawa Redblacks where he had one special teams tackle. Overall, he played in five regular season games for the Stampeders in 2019 and made two tackles on defense and two tackles on special teams. He did not play in 2020 due to the cancellation of the 2020 CFL season and was signed to an extension on December 29, 2020.

On October 16, 2021, in a game against the BC Lions, Moxey scored his first career CFL touchdown after intercepting a Michael Reilly pass and returning it 53 yards for a score. He finished his second season in the CFL having played in 13 games and contributed with 24 defensive tackles, 4 special teams tackles, two interceptions and one touchdown. Moxey continued to play an important role in the Stampeders' defense, playing in 16 regular season games and amassing a league leading 13 pass break ups, 26 defensive tackles and two tackles on special teams. Following the 2022 season he was named a CFL West division All-Star. On January 20, 2023 Moxey and the Stamps agreed to a two-year contract extension.

References

External links
Calgary Stampeders bio
Tampa Bay Buccaneers bio

1995 births
Living people
American football cornerbacks
Arizona Cardinals players
Boise State Broncos football players
Sportspeople from West Palm Beach, Florida
Tampa Bay Buccaneers players
Calgary Stampeders players
Canadian football defensive backs